A John Waters Christmas is a compilation album of Christmas music selected by cult film director John Waters.

Track listing
"Fat Daddy" – Fat Daddy
"Rudolph the Red Nosed Reindeer" – Tiny Tim
"Christmas Time Is Coming" (A Street Carol) – Stormy Weather, originally released in 1975
"Happy Birthday Jesus" – Little Cindy, originally released in 1959
"Here Comes Fatty Claus" – Rudolph & Gang  
"Little Mary Christmas" – Roger Christian
"I Wish You A Merry Christmas" – Big Dee Irwin & Little Eva
"Santa! Don't Pass Me By" – Jimmy Donley
"Sleigh Ride" – Alvin and the Chipmunks
"Sleigh Bells, Reindeer And Snow" – Rita Faye Wilson, originally released in 1955
"First Snowfall" – The Coctails
"Santa Claus Is a Black Man" – AKIM & The Teddy Vann Production Company, originally released in 1973

References

2004 Christmas albums
2004 compilation albums
Christmas compilation albums
John Waters